Neveu is a French-language surname.

People with the name include:
 Alfred Neveu (1890–1975), Swiss bobsledder
 André Neveu (born 1946), French physicist
 Boris Neveu (born 1986), French canoeist
 Brett Neveu, American playwright
 Claude Neveu, French canoeist
 Cyril Neveu (born 1956), French motorcyclist
 Franz Xaver von Neveu (1749–1828), last Prince-Bishop of Basel
 Gérald Neveu (1921–1960), French poet
 Ginette Neveu (1919–1949), French violinist
 Hilaire Neveu (1839–1913), Canadian politician
 Jacques Neveu (1932–2016), French mathematician
 Louis-Paul Neveu (1931–2017), Canadian politician
 Marcelle Neveu (1906–1993), French runner
 Mathys Neveu (1647–1726), Dutch painter
 Patrice Neveu (born 1954), French football coach and player
 Sylvaine Neveu (born 1968), French chemist and scientific director of the Solvay group

Fictional characters 
 Sophie Neveu, a fictional character in The Da Vinci Code

French-language surnames